Zhou Ye  (born 1998) is a Chinese actress. She is best known for her role as Gu Xiang in the danmei novel adaptation series Word of Honor and as Wei Lai in the film Better Days.

Career
In 2019, Zhou made her debut in the youth drama film Better Days, earning recognition for her antagonist role as a bully. She was nominated for the Most Promising Actress award at the China Movie Channel (CCTV-6) M List.  She participated in the opening ceremony of the 28th Golden Rooster Awards, and was included as one of the 32 actors in the China Movie Channel Young Actors Project.

In 2020, Zhou starred in the youth revolutionary drama The National Southwest Associated University And Us, which was broadcast on CCTV. The same year she was cast in the wuxia drama Word of Honor.

Filmography

Film

Television series

Television show

Discography

Awards and nominations

References

1998 births
Living people
21st-century Chinese actresses
Chinese film actresses
Chinese television actresses